Anna Rybicka (born 28 March 1977) is a Polish fencer. She won a silver medal in the women's team foil event at the 2000 Summer Olympics.

References

External links
 

1977 births
Living people
Polish female foil fencers
Olympic fencers of Poland
Fencers at the 1996 Summer Olympics
Fencers at the 2000 Summer Olympics
Olympic silver medalists for Poland
Olympic medalists in fencing
Sportspeople from Gdynia
Medalists at the 2000 Summer Olympics
21st-century Polish women
20th-century Polish women